Scalby may refer to:

Scalby, East Riding of Yorkshire
Scalby, North Yorkshire